El Porvenir (Spanish: The Future) is a town, with a population of 5,202 (2013 census), and a municipality in the Honduran department of Atlántida. The largest town of the Municipality is El Pino, with a population of 6,304 (2013 census).

Geography
The municipality borders with La Ceiba, San Francisco and Arenal, this one in the department of Yoro. It counts the villages of El Pino and La Unión. Much of El Porvenir extends along a coastline. The beach is a popular place for both locals and visitors, especially during Semana Santa. Most of the area surrounding El Porvenir is dominated by pineapple fields.

Transportation 
El Porvenir is serviced by both buses and mototaxies. Buses come at infrequent intervals and depart for either La Ceiba or La Unión. Mototaxies can only be taken within the city limits. Taxis are uncommon to see. The CA-13 highway goes past El Porvenir and connects it to surrounding cities and the nearby Golosón International Airport.

References

External links
 Municipality of El Porvenir (Secretary of Government and Justice)

Honduras Child Alliance (Volunteer group based out of El Porvenir)

Municipalities of the Atlántida Department